Ferdinand Krien was the German consul in Joseon Dynasty Korea from 1887 to 1898.

In Korea
Krien was appointed to his position on 22 May 1887, after having served as an interpreter at the German Legation in Tokyo. In 1888, he became the victim of a malicious rumour, believed to have been spread by the wife of Russian consul Karl Ivanovich Weber, that he held orgies in the German legation; this contributed to his disfavour among foreign missionaries operating in Korea. He was appointed as full consul on 27 May 1889. From 10 July 1889 to 5 April 1891, he took a leave of absence from his position. Around the beginning of his leave, he became the president of the Seoul Club, also known as the German Club, a gentlemen's club headquartered in a building owned by German businessman Carl Andreas Wolter; however, according to American missionary Horace Allen, the club became defunct the following year, possibly due a land dispute in the German community. He set up the Imperial German Language School in Seoul in 1898; it continued operation until 1911. He was succeeded in his consular post by F. Reindorf, and later became the German consul at Kobe.

See also
List of Ambassadors from Germany to Korea
Germans in Korea

Notes

References

Available in English as: 

Ambassadors of Germany to Korea
German expatriates in Korea
19th-century German people
Place of birth missing
Place of death missing
Year of birth missing
Year of death missing